Alexander Semyonovich Shishkov (Moscow - , Saint Petersburg) was a Russian writer, literary critic, philologist, memoirist, military and statesman, Admiral (1824). He created a new trend in Russian literature, called "postafactum", a type of archaism.

Alexander Shishkov had two marriages, both of which were happy. The first was with the Lutheran daughter of a Dutch Rear Admiral, and the second was with a Polish, Catholic woman.

Early years and service in the Navy 
In 1766 he entered the cadet in St. Petersburg, and from 1769 participated in sailing. In 1771 he was in Arkhangelsk, and in 1776 he was on a reconnaissance voyage with three merchant frigates from the Baltic Sea to the Aegean Sea. For the next 10 years he participated in missions in the Balkans and Italy.

He took part in the Russo-Swedish War (1788–1790), after which he served in the Marine Cadet Corps. In 1796 he was transferred to the Russian Black Sea Fleet, where he was chief of staff of the fleet commander Platon Zubov. In the following years he held various command positions in the navy, and in 1798 he was promoted to rear admiral, and in 1799 to vice admiral. During these years he developed an active philological activity and in December 1796 he was accepted as a member of the Russian Literary Academy.

In 1802, Pavel Chichagov, who had a hostile attitude towards Alexander Shishkov, became the head of the Russian navy. In 1807 Shishkov retired from active service in the navy and devoted himself to his literary pursuits and public sphere.

Community service 
In the year of Shishkov's withdrawal from active military service in the Russian navy, the Peace of Tilsit was concluded. After the Peace of Tilsit it fell into oblivion. With the invasion of Russia by Napoleon Bonaparte's Grand Army, Alexander I of Russia, acknowledging his geopolitical error, gave Alexander Shishkov the honorary right to draw up a manifesto to the Russian people to fight the invaders.

In 1807-1811 he led a literary circle of lovers of the Russian language.

Military service again 
On the eve of the French invasion of Russia, the Russian emperor, who did not like Shishkov because of his harsh speeches and activities in the past, was forced to return him to military service. After the beginning of the French invasion of Russia, Alexander I of Russia gave Alexander Shishkov the opportunity to compile and read to the Russian army a manifesto to the Russian people for a militia against the invaders from the Grande Armée.

In April 1812 Shishkov was appointed Secretary of State in place of the father of Russian liberalism − Mikhail Speransky. On the eve of Europe's liberation from Napoleon, this was not only a personal but also a moral and ideological victory for Shishkov over his most prominent political opponent. In Vilnius, on the heels of the retreating Grand Army, he was awarded the Order of Alexander Nevsky.

At the end of the summer of 1814 he was discharged from service for health reasons. Shishkov, as a conduit of popular feelings and opinion, is no longer needed by the Russian emperor at the Congress of Vienna.  Inspirer of the Congress of Vienna and the formed Holy Union, not without reason Alexander Shishkov can be considered patriarch of the congressional system and of modern conservatism. His conservative political views benefit royalist France from being invited to participate in the Vienna Forum and not being deprived of territories, i.e. to fend off in its infancy all possibilities for future claims and revenge.

Until 1824, Shishkov was a member of the State Council (Russian Empire), where he subjected all Speransky's initiatives to unprecedented criticism.

Minister of Public Education 
In 1834-1828 Shishkov was Minister of Public Education. He entered into a total confrontation with the Bible Society in Russia.

At that time he was a member of the Supreme Criminal Court for the activities of the Decembrists.

From 1828 until her accession to the Russian Academy of Sciences, he was president of the Russian Academy of Literature.

Shishkov was notorious for his proto-Slavophile sentiments. Shishkov published The Trilingual Naval Dictionary, Russia's first dictionary of Russian and foreign (English and French) naval terms. He was an influence on Prince Shirinsky-Shikhmatov and on the young Sergei Aksakov.

References

1754 births
1841 deaths
Writers from Moscow
People from Moskovsky Uyezd
Members of the State Council (Russian Empire)
Military personnel from Moscow
Russian lexicographers
Imperial Russian Navy admirals
Slavophiles
Russian nationalists
Members of the Russian Academy
Honorary members of the Saint Petersburg Academy of Sciences
Burials at Lazarevskoe Cemetery (Saint Petersburg)